The Billboard Latin Music Award for Producer of the Year is an honor presented annually at the Billboard Latin Music Awards, a ceremony which honors "the most popular albums, songs, and performers in Latin music, as determined by the actual sales, radio airplay, streaming and social data that informs Billboards weekly charts." The award is given to the best performing producers on Billboards Latin charts.

Recipients

Records

Most nominations

Most awards

See also
 Latin Grammy Award for Producer of the Year

References

Awards established in 1996
Billboard Latin Music Awards